Suncrest is an unincorporated community in Randolph County, West Virginia, United States.

The community derives its name from the Sun Lumber Company.

References 

Unincorporated communities in West Virginia
Unincorporated communities in Randolph County, West Virginia